Belenggu Masjarakat (Perfected Spelling Belenggu Masyarakat, released internationally as Shackled Society) is a 1953 Indonesian drama film directed by D. Suradjio and Lie Gie San, and starring Amran S. Mouna, Wahid Chan, Mimi Mariani, and Lies Permana Lestari. This film marks the screen debuts of Lestari.

Plot  
 
Suparto is a middle-ranked officer who is moved to Jakarta. He meets Harjiman, the licensing importer, who introduced him to Roostinah whose task is to seduce Suparto for help in securing the import licenses. Suparto's wife, Sulastri, comes to Jakarta when she hears about her husband's unfaithfulness. Then Suparto realizes that Roostinah is sent to seduce him, but when he returns to Sulastri, she rejects him. His crime is discovered and Suparto is sent to prison. When he completes his sentence, Suparto joins the migration to Sumatra. Then Sulastri accepts him again.

Cast

Production 
The black-and-white film was shot, and directed by D. Suradjio and Lie Gie San, and was written by Syamsuddin Syafei. It was Suradjio's first and last film as director. It starred Amran S. Mouna, Wahid Chan, Mimi Mariani, and Lies Permana Lestari.

Belenggu Masjarakat is the only film that produced by Raksi Seni Film Coy, a film company which was established by Suradjio.

Release and reception 
Belenggu Masjarakat was released in March 31, 1953, and was screened again at Metropole Theatre in Jakarta from March 31 until April 5, 1954. This film won Best Cinematography award at Indonesian Film Festival in 1955. A 35 mm copy of the film is reportedly stored at Sinematek Indonesia in Jakarta.

Film critics praised the film for not having a pleonastical dialogue like most Indonesian films of that time, such as Usmar Ismail's film. However, another review says that Belenggu Masjarakat was failed to show in-depth narrative and psychological exploration of the characters after revolutionary war.

This film featured S. Bono and Lestari in supporting roles, who later married and became the parent of actress Rini S. Bono. Lestari also made another three films role such as Rahasia Sukudomas (1954), Kasih Sajang (1954), and Tanah Harapan (1976), before leaving the film industry.

References

External links 

1953 films
1953 drama films
Indonesian drama films
Indonesian black-and-white films
Indonesian-language films
Films shot in Indonesia
Films set in Indonesia